The Lawrence Rocks are a group of two rocky islets, 6.8 ha and 1.5 ha in area, with an associated reef, 2.4 km south-east of Point Danger in western Victoria, Australia, and about 6 km south-east of the city of Portland.  Geologically, the group is formed from the remnants of an extinct volcano, with the islets composed of basalt and tuff.

The islets were sighted by Lieutenant James Grant on 5 December 1800 from the survey brig HMS Lady Nelson and named
for Captain Effingham Lawrence, 
one of the Elder Brethren of Trinity House.

Fauna

The rocks are protected as a nature reserve and are the site of a breeding colony of Australasian gannets, the overspill from which led to the establishment of a sister colony at Point Danger.  The group has been identified by BirdLife International as an Important Bird Area (IBA), because it supports over 10% of the world population of Australasian gannets, being used by over 6000 birds.  Other birds recorded on the rocks, and likely to breed there, include little penguins, black-faced cormorants, crested terns, silver gulls, sooty oystercatchers and small numbers of Cape gannets.  The rocks are also used as a haul-out site by Australian fur seals. Seal hunting was conducted on the island in the 19th century.

References

Seabird colonies
Islands of Victoria (Australia)
Nature reserves in Victoria (Australia)
Underwater diving sites in Australia
Important Bird Areas of Victoria (Australia)
Seal hunting